Pseudocetonurus septifer is a species of rattail, the only known species in the genus Pseudocetonurus. This fish is found at depths of up to 950 m in the waters around Hawaii and in the south-eastern Pacific. It has recently also been recorded on the other side of the Pacific, near Taiwan, and this species probably has a pan-Pacific distribution but has been underrecorded due to the depths in which it lives.

This species attains a length of up to 39 cm. It is unique among rattails in having 7 branchiostegal rays and a large gill opening. This is a generally very dark, sometimes black, fish with a very large head and small, widely spaced eyes. There is a small bioluminescent organ located between the pelvic fins.

References
A new species, Caelorinchus sheni, and 19 new records of grenadiers (Pisces: Gadiformes: Macrouridae) from Taiwan - CHIOU Mei-Luen ; SHAO Kwang-Tsao ; IWAMOTO Tomio

Macrouridae
Monotypic fish genera
Fish described in 1982
Fish of the Pacific Ocean